1-Methyl-3-propyl-4-(p-chlorophenyl)piperidine is a drug developed by a team led by Alan Kozikowski, which acts as a potent dopamine reuptake inhibitor, and was developed as a potential therapeutic agent for the treatment of cocaine addiction. As with related compounds such as nocaine, it is a structurally simplified derivative of related phenyltropane compounds. Its activity at the serotonin and noradrenaline transporters has not been published, though most related 4-phenylpiperidine derivatives are relatively selective for inhibiting dopamine reuptake over the other monoamine neurotransmitters. While several of its isomers are active, the (3S,4S)-enantiomer is by far the most potent. The rearranged structural isomer 2-[1-(4-chlorophenyl)butyl]piperidine is also a potent inhibitor of dopamine reuptake.

See also
 4-Fluoropethidine
 Allylprodine
 JZ-IV-10
 N,O-Dimethyl-4-(2-naphthyl)piperidine-3-carboxylate
 WY-46824

References 

Dopamine reuptake inhibitors
4-Phenylpiperidines
Chloroarenes